This is the discography of Hong Kong Cantopop singer Shirley Kwan, which includes releases in Hong Kong, Taiwan, China and Japan. It chronicles her transition from mainstream pop ballads in the late 1980s to more diversified musical styles in the '90s and beyond. By 1995, Kwan had established herself as one of the more avant-garde pop artists in Hong Kong. Many songs or albums do not have official English titles, and translations here may vary from those found in other sources.

Studio albums

Extended plays

Singles

Compilations

Live albums

Other appearances

Unreleased songs

External links
 http://www.espace.org/albums/disco.html

 
Kwan, Shirley